The 2017 Faroe Islands Premier League (also known as Effodeildin for sponsorship reasons) was the 75th season of top-tier football in the Faroe Islands. Víkingur Gøta successfully defended their first Faroese title from the previous season. The season began on 12 March 2017 and ended on 20 October 2017.

Teams

The bottom two teams from the 2016 season, B68 Toftir and AB,  were relegated to the 2017 1. deild. They were replaced by EB/Streymur and 07 Vestur, champions and runners-up of the 2016 1. deild respectively.

Prior to the start of the 2017 season, TB were merged with the other two clubs from the island of Suðuroy: FC Suðuroy and Royn Hvalba. The new club will get a new name for the 2018 season, but for the 2017 season the club will be called TB/FC Suðuroy/Royn.

Source: Scoresway

League table

Positions by round

Results
Each team plays three times (either twice at home and once away or once at home and twice away) against every other team for a total of 27 matches each.

Regular home games

Additional home games

Top goalscorers

References

Faroe Islands Premier League seasons
1
Faroe
Faroe